Miro Keskitalo (born 16 February 1996) is a Finnish ice hockey defenceman. He is currently playing with Kajaanin Hokki in the Finlands second league Mestis.
Keskitalo made his Liiga debut playing with HC TPS during the 2014–15 Liiga season.

References

External links

1996 births
Living people
Sportspeople from Vantaa
Finnish ice hockey defencemen
HC TPS players
21st-century Finnish people